Ornipholidotos dowsetti is a butterfly in the family Lycaenidae. It is found in the Republic of the Congo. The habitat consists of forests.

Adults have been recorded on wing in February.

References

Butterflies described in 2000
Ornipholidotos
Endemic fauna of the Republic of the Congo
Butterflies of Africa